The Kaskaskia–Cahokia Trail was the first road (used for walking and stagecoaches) in Illinois, running from Kaskaskia to Cahokia.

History

Native Americans
 	
The Confederated Peorias originated in the land surrounding the Great Lakes and drained by the Mississippi River. Those peoples are the Illinois or the Ilini Indians, descendants of the people who created the large mound societies in the Great Plains two to three thousand years ago. The Kaskaskia–Cahokia Trail had a role in the lives of some Ilini Indians.

Settlers
When the French created permanent settlements at Kaskaskia and Cahokia, they named these townships after the Illini Indians who lived there before.

Other villages, towns, and settlements grew over the next century dotting the east half of the Mississippi River's floodplain. This first road caused other roads that eventually led to Illinois becoming the 21st state in 1818, with Kaskaskia holding the title of the first state capital.

Points of interest
There are many interesting attractions along the Kaskaskia–Cahokia Trail which are within three Southern Illinois counties:
<ul>
Pierre Menard Home
Mississippi River Ferry
Modoc Rock Shelter
Creole House
Village Hall
St. Joseph Church
Fort de Chartres
St. Joseph Church
<li>Historic District</il>
Peterstown House
Waterloo Historic District
Bellefontain House & Spring
Moore Cemetery
KCT Remnant with Stone Arch Bridge
</ul>

References

External links

 

Historic trails and roads in Illinois
1.http://www.kctrailillinois.org/waterloo.html